Anton Bernard (born April 18, 1989) is an Italian former professional ice hockey Winger who most notably played for HC Bolzano of the ICE Hockey League (ICEHL). Bernard competed in the 2012 IIHF World Championship as a member of the Italy men's national ice hockey team.

References

External links

1989 births
Ice hockey people from Bolzano
Bolzano HC players
Living people
Italian ice hockey forwards
Starbulls Rosenheim players
Germanophone Italian people